Muhammad Masood Lali (Punjabi)(born 21 August 1951), is a Pakistani politician from Kanwain Wala, Chiniot.

Early life and education 
He was born on 21 August 1951 in Chiniot District. He is an agriculturist by profession. He is educated from GCU, Lahore of Master in Political science. He belongs to Lali, a Jat clans tribe in Chiniot District.

Early in politics 
He has been the Chairman of union councils in his area 3 times in his life. He has been also Naib Nazim of Chiniot Tehsil (2002–2005).

Political career 
He elected in 2008 Pakistan general elections for the seat of MPA from constituency no. PP-80 (Jhang-VIII). He was elected from the party Pakistan Muslim League (N).

See also 
 Chiniot
 Pakistan Muslim League (N)

References 

1951 births
Living people
Pakistan Muslim League (N) politicians
Punjabi people
People from Chiniot District
Government College University, Lahore alumni